José Luis Viejo Gómez (2 November 1949 – 16 November 2014) was a Spanish road cyclist who was professional from 1973 to 1982. He represented his native country at the 1972 Summer Olympics in Munich, West Germany, where he finished in 37th place in the men's individual road race. Viejo won the 11th stage of the 1976 Tour de France with a time difference of 22 minutes and 50 seconds to the second-placed cyclist; this is the largest lead in the Tour de France after the Second World War. He also won the Tour de Pologne 1972.

Major results

1971
Vuelta Ciclista a Navarra
1972
Memorial Valenciaga
Tour de Pologne
1976
Tour de France:
Winner stage 11
1977
Trofeo Masferrer
1978
Trofeo Elola
1980
Clasica de Sabiñanigo
1981
Costa del Azahar
1982
Guedalajara

References

External links
 Munich 1972 at the Spanish Olympic Committee
 
 

1949 births
2014 deaths
Spanish male cyclists
Spanish Tour de France stage winners
Cyclists at the 1972 Summer Olympics
Olympic cyclists of Spain
Sportspeople from the Province of Guadalajara
Cyclists from Castilla-La Mancha